Judd may refer to:

 Judd (engine), a range of racing engines built by Engine Developments Ltd.
 Judd (name), including a list of people with the name
 The Judds, an American country music duo
 The Judds (TV series), a reality-documentary television series
 Judd Records, a record label
 The Judd School, a school in Tonbridge, Kent, England
 Judd, a character in the games Splatoon,  Splatoon 2, and Splatoon 3